Nicole Boerner (born May 16, 1985) is an American model.  She has appeared on the cover of Women's Health magazine in September 2008, and the March 2011 issue of Fitness. She is a part of Wilhelmina Models. She lives in Texas, and also appeared in the advertisement for Soma women lingerie.

References

External links

Female models from California
Living people
21st-century American women
1992 births